Štefánik's Observatory (obs. code: 541) is an astronomical observatory on Petřín hill in the center of Prague founded 1928 and named after Slovak astronomer Milan Rastislav Štefánik. Nowadays the observatory specializes above all in popularization of astronomy and related natural sciences.

Technology 

The main telescopes of the observatory are a double refractor by Zeiss after the Viennese selenographer König placed in the main dome (bought in 1928) and a Maksutov-Cassegrain telescope installed in the western dome in 1976. The eastern dome of the observatory is only being used for scientific observations and since 1999 equipped with a 40 cm mirror telescope by Meade.

Gallery

See also 
 List of astronomical observatories
 Statue of Milan Rastislav Štefánik, Prague

References

External links 

 Observatory and Planetarium of Prague Official Site

Astronomical observatories in the Czech Republic
1928 establishments in Czechoslovakia
Petřín
20th-century architecture in the Czech Republic